Elba Lebrón (born 4 March 1979) is a Puerto Rican softball player. She competed in the women's tournament at the 1996 Summer Olympics.

she is a Panamerican Games Silver Medalist 

She write her first book Elbita La Chica Olimpica 2021

References

1979 births
Living people
Puerto Rican softball players
Olympic softball players of Puerto Rico
Softball players at the 1996 Summer Olympics
Place of birth missing (living people)